Movchan is a surname of Ukrainian-language origin.
Iryna Movchan (born 1990), Ukrainian figure skater
Julian Movchan (1913–2002), Ukrainian-American writer
Oleksiy Movchan (born 1994), Ukrainian politician
Olena Movchan (born 1976), Ukrainian trampoline gymnast
Pavlo Movchan (born 1939), Ukrainian poet
Valery Movchan (born 1959), Soviet cyclist

See also
 
 Molchan, alternative spelling

Ukrainian-language surnames